The Progress Party was a short-lived Norwegian political party. The party was registered on 17 July 1957 and was headed by Jan Palmer Tiseth from Svorkmo. It ran for election in the county of Sør-Trøndelag in 1957, where it achieved 0.1% of the vote. The party received the fewest votes during the election and was not represented in the Norwegian Parliament. As late as in 1965, the party was still reported to be a registered political party in Norway, but it did not run for any elections since 1957.

References 

1957 establishments in Norway
Defunct political parties in Norway
Political parties established in 1957
Political parties with year of disestablishment missing